"Save Dat Money" (stylized as $ave Dat Money), is a song by American rapper Lil Dicky featuring fellow American rappers Fetty Wap and Rich Homie Quan, from the formers' debut studio album Professional Rapper. It was released on June 10, 2015 as the album's third single. It was produced by Money Alwayz and peaked at number 71 on the Billboard Hot 100.

Music video 
The music video premiered on September 17, 2015 on Lil Dicky's YouTube account. It was directed by Tony Yacenda and produced by Jim Cummings. The video describes Dicky wanting to make the "best rap video ever" without spending any money. Throughout the video, he goes door-to-door through the mansions of Beverly Hills, asking owners if he can use their homes for a quick fifteen minutes to film it. Mrs. "K" agrees, allowing them to use her home in the video. He asks a Lamborghini dealership to borrow a car, and a boater to borrow a boat owned by Freddie Avila a.k.a. AvilaVIP, as well as models. As the title suggests, he does spend a dime. In fact, he earns $600 because of the product placement he exchanged everything for.

Fetty Wap and Rich Homie Quan also appear performing onstage with Dicky in the video. The video features cameos from T-Pain, Sarah Silverman, Abbi Jacobson, Ilana Glazer, Kevin Durant, Hannibal Buress, Dillon Francis, Mark Cuban, and Tom Petty.

Chart performance

Certifications

References

External links

2015 singles
Lil Dicky songs
Fetty Wap songs
Rich Homie Quan songs
2015 songs
Songs written by Fetty Wap